Travis Mohr (born 1981) is a former world record setting Paralympic swimmer and civil engineer.

Born without femurs in both of his legs, Mohr began swimming lessons at the age of 5. Mohr went on to compete in the 1996 Summer Paralympics at the age of 15. Though he did not medal Mohr continued competing and qualified for the 2000 Sydney Paralympic Games where he won a bronze and gold medal in his classification. 

In 2002 at the IPC World Championships he won two more gold medals. At the Canadian Open in 2003 he set three new world records: the 100m freestyle, the 200m individual medley and the 100m breaststroke. He broke his own 100m breaststroke record later that year at the Last Chance Meet in Indianapolis, Indiana. 

In 2004 Mohr broke his own record for the second time at the Paralympic swim trials in Minnesota and set a new world record in the 50m breaststroke.

Mohr went on to win a gold and silver medal at the 2004 Summer Paralympics. Mohr broke his world record again for the 50m breaststroke.

Mohr graduated from Drexel University in 2004 with a degree in civil engineering. 

In 2003 and 2004 Mohr was the recipient of the USA Swimming Trischa L. Zorn Award. 

Mohr was nominated in 2004 for an ESPY Award for Best Athlete with a Disability.

References

1981 births
Living people
American male backstroke swimmers
American male breaststroke swimmers
Drexel University alumni
World record holders in paralympic swimming
Paralympic swimmers of the United States
Swimmers at the 1996 Summer Paralympics
Swimmers at the 2000 Summer Paralympics
Swimmers at the 2004 Summer Paralympics
Paralympic gold medalists for the United States
Paralympic silver medalists for the United States
Paralympic bronze medalists for the United States
Medalists at the 2000 Summer Paralympics
Medalists at the 2004 Summer Paralympics
Paralympic medalists in swimming
S8-classified Paralympic swimmers
Medalists at the World Para Swimming Championships
Sportspeople from Northampton County, Pennsylvania